The 2021 Valorant Champions was an esports tournament for the first-person shooter video game Valorant. It was the first-ever edition of VALORANT Champions, the culmination of Valorant Champions Tour, an annual international tournament organized by the game's developer Riot Games. The tournament was held from December 1 to 12 in Berlin, Germany. Sixteen teams qualified for the tournament based on their result via 2021 VALORANT Masters: Stage 3, the regional Circuit Point standings in the year, and the regional Last Chance Qualifiers.

"Die For You" was the tournament's theme song, put together by Grabbitz, while Zedd, and Dabin, produced their own respective remix versions of the theme song.

Acend won the Valorant world championship after defeating Gambit Esports in the finals by a score of 3–2.

Venues 
Berlin was the city chosen to host the competition. The Group Stage was held at the Marlene-Dietrich-Halle, while the Semifinals and Finals was held at the Verti Music Hall.

Qualified teams 
A total of 16 teams qualified for Champions. The winner of the Stage 3 Masters automatically qualified for the event, 11 teams qualified through circuit points, and four teams qualified through a "Last Chance Qualifier".

Group stage 
The group stage ran from December 1 to 7, 2022. Groups were decided based on teams' achievements in competitions of Valorant Challengers and Valorant Masters, circuit point, and estimated strength for each region. All 16 teams are divided into 4 groups of four teams each playing in a GSL-style double-elimination format. Games were held in a best-of-three series, and only the top two teams in each group qualified for the playoffs.

Brackets 

Group A

Group B

Group C

Group D

Knockout stage 
The knockout stage began on December 8, culminating in the finals on December 12. Eight teams were drawn into a single-elimination bracket. The top-seeded team of each group was drawn against the second-seeded team of a different group. The teams from same group were be on opposite sides of the bracket, meaning they could play each other until the Finals. All matches were best-of-three, except for the finals, which was is best-of-five.

Bracket

Prize pool

References 

International esports competitions hosted by Germany
Valorant competitions
2021 first-person shooter tournaments
2021 in Berlin
Sports competitions in Berlin